Chirgwin is a surname. Notable people with the surname include:

Brian Chirgwin (born 1948), Australian rules footballer
Dick Chirgwin (1914–2000), Australian rules footballer
George H. Chirgwin (1854–1922), British music hall star